Eduard Nipmann (21 April 1889 Tallinn – 22 June 1960 Tallinn) was an Estonian politician. He was a member of Estonian Constituent Assembly.

References

1889 births
1960 deaths
Members of the Estonian Constituent Assembly